Perivolia may refer to several places in Greece and Cyprus:

Perivolia, Arcadia, a village in Arcadia, part of Megalopoli
Perivolia, Kissamos, a village in the Chania regional unit, part of Kissamos
Perivolia, Rethymno, a village in the Rethymno regional unit, part of Rethymno
Perivolia, Theriso, a village in the Chania regional unit, part of Theriso
Perivolia, Elis, a village in Elis, part of Figaleia
Perivolia, Laconia, a village in Laconia, part of Pellana
Pervolia, a village near Larnaca, Cyprus, sometimes also spelt Perivolia

See also
Perivoli (disambiguation)